Guangzhou Fuda Cancer Hospital is a tertiary specialized cancer hospital which is affiliated with the Health Department of Guangdong Province in China. It was designated a national key clinical (cancer) hospital by the National Health and Family Planning Commission in 2011. The same year, Guangzhou Fuda Cancer Hospital was honored with National Trustworthy Private Hospital by the National Institute of Hospital Administration. In 2012, China Hospital Association rated Guangzhou Fuda Cancer Hospital as China Public Confidence Model Hospital. It was accredited by JCI in 2014.

Guangzhou Fuda Cancer Hospital has locations in Tianhe District (located in the 2nd, Tangde Xi Road, Tianhe District, Guangzhou) and one in Haizhu District (located in Jude Zhong Road, Haizhu District, Guangzhou). The hospital has so far received more than 15 million RMB (estimated 2.5 million in US$) of cancer research grant.

Regarding patients with medium or advanced cancer as the main treating objects which is treated as medical difficulty in the world, Guangzhou Fuda Cancer Hospital adopts the international latest anticancer concept in focusing on applying 3C+P treatment model that composed of cryosurgical ablation (CSA), cancer microsphere intervention (CMI), combined immunotherapy for cancer (CIC including NK and CAR-T cell immunotherapy) and personalized treatment, which aims at prolonging and improving patients’ lives in recent 10 years. Guangzhou Fuda Cancer Hospital remains at the forefront of cryosurgical ablation in treating cancer both in the number of treatments and types of tumors. Especially in treating central lung cancer, giant liver cancer, and pancreatic cancer, it makes a lot of achievements and obtains domestic and international awards many times.

Departments 

Guangzhou Fuda Cancer Hospital contains Oncology, Internal Medicine, Surgery, Gynecology, Pediatric Department, Ophthalmology, Otorhinolaryngology, Stomatology, Dermatology, Rehabilitation Medicine, Palliative Care, Anesthesia, Pain Management, Pathology, Traditional Chinese Medicine, Imaging Department etc. There are also several research departments in Fuda Cancer Hospital, including Fuda Cancer Prevention and Rehabilitation Center, Central Laboratory, Union Laboratory, Biotherapy Center.

Locations

North Campus 
Address: No 2, Tangde Xi Rd, Tianhe District, Guangzhou, China, 510665.

South Campus 
Address: 91, 93 Jude Zhong Rd, Chigang District, Guangzhou, China, 510305.

Treatments 
Guangzhou Fuda Cancer Hospital practices irreversible electroporation, cryoablation, combined immunotherapy, microvascular intervention, brachytherapy, photodynamic therapy, TCM and other therapies in clinical treatments, which has saved many lives.

Honors 
2007 Philippine College for Advancement in Medicine Foundation
2009 Guangzhou Fuda Cancer Hospital was voted "National Best Cancer Hospital"
2010 Guangzhou Fuda Cancer Hospital was rated one of "Growth-type Enterprise -- Ten Enterprises Characterized with Social Responsibility"
2010 Guangzhou Fuda Cancer Hospital won "2010 Innovation Hospital" honorable title
2011 Guangzhou Fuda Cancer Hospital was Titled "National Trustworthy Private Hospital"
2011 Guangzhou Fuda Cancer Hospital became one of the National Key Clinical Cancer Speciality Centres designated by the Chinese Government
2011 Guangzhou Fuda Cancer Hospital Oncology was awarded Key Clinical Cancer Specialty of Guangdong Province by Guangdong Health Department

References

External links 
 Fuda Cancer Hospital-Guangzhou

Hospital buildings completed in 2001
Hospitals in Guangzhou
2001 establishments in China
Hospitals established in 2001
Cancer hospitals in China